Rodrigo Daniel Quiroga (born March 23, 1987) is an Argentine volleyball player member of the Argentina men's national volleyball team and Polish club Jastrzębski Węgiel. He participated at the 2012 Summer Olympics. Rodrigo won the silver medal at the South American Championship in 2007, 2009, 2011 and 2013 and the gold medal at the 2015 Pan American Games.

Personal life
He is nephew of Raúl Quiroga, who is bronze medalist of the Olympic Games 1988 and son of Daniel Quiroga - a former volleyball player. His brother Gonzalo also plays volleyball.

Career

Clubs
In September 2014 Quiroga signed a contract with Brazilian team Vôlei Canoas.

Sporting achievements

Clubs

Men's South American Volleyball Club Championship
  2013 - with Vivo/Minas

National championships
 2005/2006  Argentine Championship, with Club de Amigos
 2011/2012  Turkish Cup, with Fenerbahçe Grundig
 2011/2012  Turkish Championship, with Fenerbahçe Grundig

National team

Pan American Games
  2015 Canada

South American Championship
  2007 Chile
  2009 Colombia
  2011 Brazil
  2013 Brazil

Individually
 2013 South American Club Championship - Best Outside Spiker
 2013 South American Championship - Best Outside Spiker
 2015 South American Championship - Best Outside Spiker

References

External links
 FIVB profile
 LegaVolley player profile

1987 births
Living people
People from San Juan, Argentina
Argentine people of Galician descent
Argentine men's volleyball players
Olympic volleyball players of Argentina
Volleyball players at the 2012 Summer Olympics
Expatriate volleyball players in Greece
Argentine expatriate sportspeople in Brazil
Argentine expatriate sportspeople in Greece
Argentine expatriate sportspeople in Italy
Argentine expatriate sportspeople in Turkey
Fenerbahçe volleyballers
Volleyball players at the 2015 Pan American Games
Pan American Games gold medalists for Argentina
Pan American Games medalists in volleyball
Jastrzębski Węgiel players
Medalists at the 2015 Pan American Games
Sportspeople from San Juan Province, Argentina